Gurjant Singh Budhsinghwala (1964 - 29 July 1992) was the third chief of the Khalistan Liberation Force.

Early life and family
Gurjant Singh was born in the village of Budhsinghwala, District Faridkot in 1964.  He had four siblings — one sister and three brothers. He was learned, although after being tortured by the police multiple times and his grandfather being killed by Punjab Police, as he was a religious Amritdhari Sikh, he joined the KLF in 1986.

Participation in the Khalistan Movement
Gurjant Singh's grandfather died in 1984 when Indian Security Forces opened indiscriminate firing on his home, even though he participated in no crimes. Gurjant Singh took revenge and killed top Punjab  Police officers including AS Brar and SSP Patiala.

Budhsinghwala commanded of a faction of Khalistan Liberation Force.

India Today's Volume 17 mentioned that Budhsinghwala was responsible for the killings and injury of key police officers and politicians.

Death
Budhsinghwala was killed in a police encounter on 29 July 1992, in Ludhiana, when he and other members of KLF were meeting. The firefight took several hours. His body was not returned to his family and was secretly cremated as police feared that his body might be used as a propaganda tool. At the time of his death, he was wanted in 37 cases of assassination.

There was a 2.5 million rupee bounty on Gurjant Singh at his time of death.

After Budhsinghwala's death, Dr Pritam Singh Sekhon succeeded him as head of the KLF.

References

External links
 A Life Scketch of Bhai Gurjant Singh Ji (in Punjabi Language) 

Punjabi people
People shot dead by law enforcement officers in India
Indian Sikhs
Khalistan movement people
1964 births
1992 deaths
Insurgency in Punjab
Assassination of Rajiv Gandhi